Tillandsia nana is a species of flowering plant in the Bromeliaceae family. This species is native to Bolivia.

References

nana
Flora of Bolivia
Taxa named by John Gilbert Baker